Şüräle (Tatar and Bashkir: Шүрәле, [ʃyræˈlɘ]) is a forest spirit in Tatar and Bashkir mythology. According to legends, Şüräle lives in forests. He has long fingers, a horn on its forehead, and a woolly body. He lures victims into the thickets and can tickle them to death.

Şüräle closely resembles other similar characters from the folklore such as Arçuri of the Chuvash, Pitsen (Picen) of the Siberian Tatars and Yarımtıq of the Ural Tatars.

Description
He can shapeshift into many different forms. As a human, he looks like a peasant with glowing eyes, and his shoes are on backwards. A person who befriends Şüräle can learn the secrets of magic. Farmers and shepherds would make pacts with the leshy to protect their crops and sheep. Şüräle has many tricks, including leading peasants astray, making them sick, or tickling them to death. They are also known to hide the axes of woodcutters. A person gets lost in the woods when a Şüräle crosses their path. To find the way out, you have to turn your clothes inside out and wear shoes on opposite feet.

Inspired by the Tatar folklore, Ghabdulla Tuqay wrote a poem Şüräle. Şüräle was Tuqay's pseudonym. The first Tatar ballet by Farit Yarullin had its name after Şüräle.

See also
 Archura
 Äbädä

References

Bibliography
 Mitolojik Varlıklar, Çulpan Zaripova 
 Tatar Türklerinde Varlıklar, Çulpan Zaripova  (Şürälä)

Related links 
 English translation of the poem
 French translation of an article about Shurale
 Russian translation of the poem
 The Myth of Shurale
 Айгуль Габаши, «ШУРАЛЕ», журнал «Татарский мир» № 3, 2005 
 Памятник Шурале в Казани 

Turkic legendary creatures
Forest spirits

Arçura/Şüräle: Mythical Spirits of the Volga-Ural Forests, Rustem Sulteev. http://akademiai.com/doi/abs/10.1556/062.2018.71.1.4?journalCode=062